New Day Dawning may refer to:

New Day Dawning (Cherish the Ladies album) (1996)
New Day Dawning (Wynonna Judd album) (2000)